The Religion Communicators Council is an American nonprofit organization representing marketing, communications and public relations officers from 60 different faith-based institutions in the United States. Founded in 1929 as the Religious Publicity Council, it changed its name to the National Religious Publicity Council in 1949, the Religious Public Relations Council in 1963, and became the Religion Communicators Council in 1998. It was originally focused on communications needs for Christian organizations, but in 1970 it expanded its membership to all religious faiths.

The organization is headquartered in the Interchurch Center in New York City and has 13 branches across the U.S. It hosts an annual conference to discuss media strategies and issues. It also presents the Wilbur Awards, an annual tribute to mainstream media's coverage of faith-based issues.

Wilbur Awards

The Council has presented Wilbur Awards annually since 1949. They honor excellence by individuals in secular media – print and online journalism, book publishing, broadcasting, and motion pictures – in communicating religious issues, values and themes. Winners receive a stained-glass trophy and $250. The award is named for Marvin C. Wilbur, a pioneer in religious public relations and longtime Council leader.

2017 
Newspapers, feature story: 
Newspapers, series: Peter Smith, Silent Sanctuaries, in the Pittsburgh Post-Gazette
Newspapers, column: Grace Conenna, Paula Chin, Winning At Life: Woman's Day
Newspapers, blogs: David Waters, Faith Matters
Magazines, article: Daniel Cox, Public Religion Research Institute, Religious Diversity May Be Making America Less Religious
Magazines, columns:
Editorial Cartoons: 
Books: Betty Livingston-Adams, Black Women's Christian Activism: Seeking Social Justice in a Northern Suburb
Television, local news: Kenya Barris, black-ish
Television, national news: 
Television, national news magazine: Joe Astrouski, reporter and photographer, Century Songs: St. Hildegard von Bingen Schola
Television, documentary: Morgan Freeman, James Younger, Lori McCreary, The Story of God with Morgan Freeman
Radio:
Film:
Lifetime Achievement:

2010 and 2016 
Newspapers, feature story:  "Young Muslims after 9/11," Peter Smith, The Courier Journal, Louisville, Ky.
Newspapers, series: "Faith in Motion," Mindy Rubenstein, St. Petersburg (Fla.) Times.
Digital Communications: Faith-Based Blogs: Dr. David Gushee
Newspapers, column: "Sunday Reflections," Tracey O’Shaughnessy, Republican-American, Waterbury, Conn.
Newspapers, blogs: "Under God," David Waters, The Washington Post.
Magazines, article: "The Rise of the Godless," Paul Starobin, National Journal. 
Magazines, columns: Lisa Miller, Newsweek.
Editorial Cartoons: John Sherffius, Daily Camera, Boulder, Colo.
Books: Have A Little Faith, Mitch Albom, Hyperion .
Television, local news: "Shepherd Me Oh God," Randy Biery, photography, and Fran Riley, reporter, KWQC-TV, Davenport, Iowa.
Television, national news: CBS Evening News: Weekend Edition, "Peace on Earth," John Blackstone, correspondent; Erin Lyall George, producer; and Patricia Shevlin, executive producer.
Television, national news magazine: Religion & Ethics Newsweekly, "Wintley Phipps," Kim Lawton, correspondent, Judy Reynolds, producer.
Television, documentary: "Science of the Soul," Associated Producers, Toronto, Canada, Simcha Jacobovici, writer/director.
Radio: "The Soundscapes of Faith," Laura Kwerel, writer/producer, Katie Davis, editor, Interfaith Voices, Brentwood, Md.
Film: "Blood Done Sign My Name," Paladin and Real Folk Productions, written and directed by Jeb Stuart.
Lifetime Achievement: Bob Abernethy.
The 2010 Awards were presented on April 9 during Religion Communication Congress 2010 at the Chicago Marriott Downtown Magnificent Mile. Manya A. Brachear, religion reporter for the Chicago Tribune and a double Wilbur Awards winner in 2009, was master of ceremonies.

2009 
Newspapers, feature story: "Trial, Triumph and Transition at Chicago's Trinity," Manya A. Brachear with Margaret Ramirez and Christi Parsons, Chicago Tribune
Newspapers, series:
Newspapers, column:
Newspapers, blogs:
Magazines, article:
Magazines, columns: 
Editorial Cartoons: John Sherffius, Daily Camera, Boulder, Colorado
Books: "Blind Spot: When Journalists Don't Get Religion," Paul Marshall, Lela Gilbert, and Roberta Green-Ahmanson, Oxford University Press
Television, local news:
Television, national news: 
Television, national news magazine: "With Full Honor," CBS News Sunday Morning, Rand Morrison, executive producer, David Martin, correspondent
Television, documentary:
Radio:
Film:  "Pray The Devil Back To Hell," Gini Reticker, director, and Abigail E. Disney, producer, Fork Films
Lifetime Achievement:

2008 
Newspapers, feature story:
Newspapers, series:
Newspapers, column:
Newspapers, blogs:
Magazines, article:
Magazines, columns:
Editorial Cartoons:
Books:
Television, local news:
Television, national news:
Television, national news magazine:
Television, documentary:
Radio:
Film:
Lifetime Achievement:

2003 
Newspapers, feature story:
Newspapers, series:
Newspapers, column:
Newspapers, blogs:
Magazines, article:
Magazines, columns:
Editorial Cartoons: Jef Mallett, for Frazz
Books:
Television, local news:
Television, national news:
Television, national news magazine:
Television, documentary:
Radio:
Film:
Lifetime Achievement:

References

External links
Religion Communicators Council web site

Religious organizations based in the United States
Professional associations based in the United States
Religious organizations established in 1929
1929 establishments in the United States